Alfred Williams Anthony (13 January 1860 – 20 January 1939) was an American author, Freewill Baptist leader, and religion professor at Bates College in Maine.

Biography
He was born in Providence, Rhode Island, on 13 January 1860 to Lewis Williams Anthony and Britannia Franklin Waterman. He was a descendant of Rhode Island founder, Roger Williams. Anthony graduated from Brown University in 1883 and Cobb Divinity School in 1885, which was then affiliated with Bates College.  Anthony also received an A.M. degree from Brown in 1886.

In 1887, he was appointed to a professorship at Cobb Divinity School and went on to publish various books and articles. When the Divinity School merged with the College religion department, he became a religion professor at Bates College serving from 1908 to 1911. He retired from Bates in 1918 to New York City. He donated land in Lewiston near Bates College to the Stanton Bird Club to create Thorncrag Nature Sanctuary. Anthony was also active in various Freewill Baptist institutions and served as President of the Board of Trustees of Storer College in West Virginia.  He was also Chairman of the Committee on Goodwill between Jews and Christians. He travelled to Africa and Asia as Secretary for the Free Will Baptist Home Missions Council.  Anthony also as a Trustee for Bates College, Hillsdale College, and Brown University.

He died on 20 January 1939 and was buried in Swan Point Cemetery in Rhode Island.

Books and honors
Anthony published various notable books including An Introduction to the Life of Jesus (1896), The Method of Jesus (1899) and Bates College and Its Background (1936). He received an honorary D. D. from Bates in 1902, Brown in 1908, and an L.L.D. from Colby in 1914. Anthony died on January 20, 1939.

Family
Anthony married Harriet Wyatt Angell in September 1885, and they had three children: Elizabeth Williams, Lewis Wilmarth (who died as a child) and Alfred Williams Anthony, Jr. Elizabeth also graduated from Bates College in 1908. His first wife died in 1899. In February 1903 Anthony married Gertrude Brown Libbey, with whom he had three further children: Richard Lewis, Warren Shaw and Charles Sheldon Anthony.

References

External links 
Bates College Special Collections' information on Anthony
The Method of Jesus by Alfred Anthony (1899)

Bates College alumni
Brown University alumni
Baptists from Maine
Writers from Providence, Rhode Island
1860 births
1939 deaths
Hillsdale College people
Baptists from Rhode Island
19th-century American male writers
20th-century American male writers
Free Will Baptists
Cobb Divinity School alumni